Paul Anthony Madden,  (born 10 October 1948) is a British chemist and former Provost of The Queen's College, Oxford.

Early life
Madden attended St Bede's Grammar School, a Catholic boys' grammar school in Bradford, Yorkshire, England. He gained BSc and DPhil degrees in chemistry at the University of Sussex. His doctoral thesis was titled "Reactive Scattering Calculations" and was completed in 1974.

Career
From 1981-84 he worked at the Royal Signals and Radar Establishment in Malvern, Worcestershire.

From 1984 until 2005 he was Fellow in Chemistry at The Queen's College, Oxford and also Senior Tutor of the college and Chairman of the University Information Technology Committee. From 2004 until 2008 he was Professor of Physical Chemistry and Director of Centre for Science at Extreme Conditions at the University of Edinburgh. He took up the office of Provost of The Queen's College on 2 August 2008 and was succeeded by Dr Claire Craig CBE on 2 August 2019.

He was awarded the Mulliken Medal of the University of Chicago for his achievements in Theoretical and Physical Chemistry. He has served as Miller Visiting Professor at the University of California, Berkeley. 
He was elected to the Fellowship of the Royal Society in 2001 and is a Fellow of the Royal Society of Edinburgh.

He was appointed a member of the ad hoc Board of Electors to the Professorship of Chemistry in the University of Cambridge on the nomination of the Faculty Board of Chemistry.

Personal life
He is married to Alison.

References

External links
 The Queen's College, Oxford

 

 
 
 

1948 births
Living people
Academics of the University of Edinburgh
Alumni of the University of Sussex
English chemists
Fellows of Magdalene College, Cambridge
Fellows of The Queen's College, Oxford
Fellows of the Royal Society
People educated at St. Bede's Grammar School
Scientists from Bradford
Provosts of The Queen's College, Oxford